Leonardo Haberkorn Manevich (born 27 December 1963 in Montevideo) is a Uruguayan journalist, professor and writer.

Works
Nueve historias uruguayas. Ediciones de la Plaza, 2004. 
Historia de Peñarol (with Luciano Álvarez). Aguilar, 2005. 
Historias tupamaras. Nuevos testimonios sobre los mitos del MLN. Fin de Siglo, 2008. 
Preguntas y respuestas sobre animales del Uruguay (children's book). Sudamericana, 2008. 
Crónicas de sangre, sudor y lágrimas. Fin de Siglo, 2009.
Animales del Uruguay II. Preguntas y respuestas para mentes inquietas (children's book). Sudamericana, 2012. 
El dulce de leche, una historia uruguaya
Guía Ecoturística de los Bañados del Este (various authors; published by Probides)
Bordes y confines (various authors; published by the Colombian chancellery)
Barrio Peñarol: patrimonio industrial ferroviario (various authors; published by IMM and Claeh)
Carbonero querido (history of Peñarol for children)
Milicos y tupas. Fin de Siglo, 2011 (5th ed.) 
Relato oculto. Las desmemorias de Víctor Hugo Morales (with Luciano Álvarez). Planeta, 2012. 
Pablo Bengoechea, la clase del Profesor. Debolsillo, 2013. 
Liberaij. La verdadera historia del caso Plata quemada. Sudamericana, 2014.

References

1963 births
Living people
Uruguayan journalists
Uruguayan writers
People from Montevideo